Christi A. Grimm is an American government official who has served as the Inspector General in the United States Department of Health and Human Services since February 2022.

Early life and education
Grimm holds a Bachelor of Arts from the University of Colorado, Denver and a Master of Public Administration from New York University. She is also a graduate of the Kennedy School of Senior Managers in Government at Harvard University.

Career 
Grimm began her career at the HHS Office of the Inspector General (OIG) in 1999 as an evaluator and later served as a Senior Program Analyst in OIG’s Office of Evaluation and Inspections. Grimm was the Chief of Staff and Deputy Inspector General for the Immediate Office of HHS from 2014 to 2019. 

Since January 2020, Grimm has been performing the duties of the Inspector General for HHS. As the head of HHS OIG, she leads an independent and objective organization of more than 1,600 auditors, evaluators, investigators, lawyers, and management professionals who carry out OIG’s mission to protect the integrity of HHS programs as well as the health and welfare of the people they serve. Grimm represents HHS OIG as a statutory member of the Pandemic Response Accountability Committee, created in March 2020 to oversee funds released by the CARES Act and similar legislation.

View full biography here.

Principal Deputy Inspector General 
Christi A. Grimm was sworn in as the sixth Inspector General of the U.S. Department of Health and Human Services (HHS) on February 22, 2022, following her nomination by the President and confirmation by the U.S. Senate.

Grimm was promoted to the Principal Deputy Inspector General role and began performing the duties of Inspector General in January 2020 after the Acting IG and former PDIG, Joanne Chiedi, retired.

On April 6, 2020, Grimm issued an OIG report surveying the experience of hospitals from March 23 to 27 during the COVID-19 pandemic in the United States. The report conveyed hospitals' experiences of "severe shortages" of COVID-19 testing supplies and "widespread shortages" of medical personal protective equipment, among other challenges. When asked about these findings at a White House Coronavirus Task Force press briefing, President Donald Trump responded, "It's just wrong. Did I hear the word ‘inspector general’? Really? It's wrong. And they'll talk to you about it. It's wrong." He then asked reporters to tell him the name of the HHS IG, "Where did he come from — the inspector general? What's his name? ... No, what's his name? What's his name? ... If you find me his name, I’d appreciate it." Trump subsequently attacked the credibility of Grimm on Twitter on April 7, demanding, "Why didn't the I.G., who spent 8 years with the Obama Administration (Did she Report on the failed H1N1 Swine Flu debacle where 17,000 people died?), want to talk to the Admirals, Generals, V.P. & others in charge, before doing her report. Another Fake Dossier!"

On May 1, 2020, President Trump nominated Jason Weida to be the permanent HHS Inspector General to replace Grimm. Grimm continued to serve as Principal Deputy Inspector General performing the duties of the IG pending Weida's confirmation by the Senate. His nomination ultimately stalled, and Grimm continued to serve in this role through the rest of the Trump administration and into the Biden administration.

Nomination as Permanent IG
On June 18, 2021, President Joe Biden nominated Grimm to serve permanently as Inspector General. Hearings on her nomination were held by the Senate Finance Committee on September 22, 2021. The committee favorably reported her nomination on November 17, 2021; the Senate Homeland Security Committee also reported the nomination favorably on December 9, 2021. Grimm's nomination was confirmed by the entire United States Senate on February 17, 2022.

Awards and recognitions
Grimm has received the Secretary’s Award for Excellence in Management and the Council of the Inspectors General on Integrity and Efficiency Award for Excellence in Management.

See also
2020 dismissal of inspectors general
Department of Health and Human Services appointments by Joe Biden

References 

Inspectors General of the United States Department of Health and Human Services
United States Inspectors General by name
Inspectors General removed or fired by Donald Trump
Living people
Year of birth missing (living people)
University of Colorado Denver alumni
New York University alumni
Biden administration personnel